Cameroon competed at the 2022 Commonwealth Games at Birmingham, England from 28 July to 8 August 2022. It was their seventh appearance at the Commonwealth Games.

The Cameroon team consisted of 37 athletes.

Athlete Emmanuel Eseme and judoka Ayuk Otay Arrey Sophina were the country's flagbearers during the opening ceremony.

Medalists

Competitors
The following is the list of number of competitors participating at the Games per sport/discipline.

Athletics

Men
Track and road events

Field events

Women
Track and road events

Field events

Badminton

Boxing

Men

Women

Judo

Para powerlifting

Swimming

Men

Women

Table tennis

Weightlifting

Junior Ngadja Nyabeyeu qualified for the competition by winning gold at the 2021 Commonwealth Weightlifting Championships in Tashkent, Uzbekistan.

Wrestling

Repechage Format

Group stage Format

References

External links
Cameroon Olympic and Sports Committee Official site 

Nations at the 2022 Commonwealth Games
Cameroon at the Commonwealth Games
2022 in Cameroonian sport